WHDI (91.9 FM) is a radio station licensed to Sister Bay, Wisconsin, and serving the Door County area. The station is part of Wisconsin Public Radio (WPR), and airs WPR's "Ideas Network", consisting of news and talk programming.

The WHDI signal also makes it across Green Bay and into areas of Northeast Wisconsin that may be out of clear range of WHID and into south central portions of the Upper Peninsula of Michigan providing an alternative to Marquette, MI based WNMU, specifically in the Escanaba, MI area.

See also Wisconsin Public Radio

External links
Wisconsin Public Radio

HDI
Wisconsin Public Radio
NPR member stations